Molathadu is a sacred waist thread used by Hindu men to ward off evil. It is mainly used in South India. It usually is in red or black. Tying the thread around the waist is an old tradition that has been practiced for thousands of years, and it is thought to be a symbol of protection from bad spirits. It is mostly the Hindu and Muslim communities in southern India that adhere to these customs and traditions. Black or red colored threads are typically used.

References

Hindu culture